Community interpreting is a type of interpreting service which is primarily found in community-based situations. It is a service provided in communities with large numbers of ethnic minorities, enabling those minorities to access services where the language barrier might be an obstacle. Contexts in which such interpreters are necessary are typical include medical, educational, housing, social security and legal areas. Community interpreting includes sign-language as well as spoken language interpreting.

Community interpreters need not only to be fluent in the language that they are interpreting, but also with the public services involved, to be aware of the cultural and racial implications of the interpreting work. Community interpreting is usually source-text oriented, as opposed to translations that may be target-audience oriented. Interpreters are also expected to follow the Interpreter's Code of Ethics.

The label is considered controversial by those who argue that the classification of different types of interpreting is inherently divisive.

References

External links 
 Critical Link International
 Community Interpreting AIIC (Professional Interpreters Organisation)
 Course on Community Interpreting offered

Language interpretation